Oxley College is an independent school located in Burradoo, New South Wales, Australia.

History
The college was founded in 1983, and had an initial enrolment of 24 students.

Houses
The college houses are named after notable Australian pioneers in specific fields. The senior school consists of six houses: Dobell, Durack, Florey, Mawson, Monash, and Oodgeroo. The junior school has three houses: Chisholm, Flynn, and Walton.

See also
 List of non-government schools in New South Wales

References

Educational institutions established in 1983
1983 establishments in Australia
Burradoo, New South Wales